The Legend of Frenchie King or Petroleum Girls is a 1971 French, Spanish, Italian  and British international co-production western comedy film directed by Christian-Jaque and starring Claudia Cardinale and Brigitte Bardot.

Plot
In Bougival Junction, Texas in 1888 the Francophone town is led by Marie Sarrazin. A new family arrives, calling themselves the Millers, but in fact they are the daughters of the hanged outlaw Frenchie King. His eldest daughter Louise seeks to keep her father's name alive by donning men's clothing and continuing his criminal ways. Louise and Marie fight, but when they are jailed, they team up to take revenge on the town's men.

Cast
 Claudia Cardinale as Marie Sarrazin
 Brigitte Bardot as Louise a.k.a. Frenchie King
 Michael J. Pollard as the Marshal
 Patty Shepard as Petite Pluie
 Emma Cohen as Virginie
 Teresa Gimpera as Caroline
 Oscar Davis as Mathieu
 Georges Beller as Marc
 Patrick Préjan as Luc
 Rocardo Salvino as Jean
 Henri Czarniak as Doc Miller 
 Valéry Inkijnoff as Spitting Bull
 Micheline Presle as Aunt Amelie
 Denise Provence as Mlle. Letellier
 Leroy Hayns as Marquis
 José Luis López Vázquez as a barber
 Manuel Zarzo as a roulette player
 Jacques Jouanneau as M. Letellier
 Raoul Delfossé as Le Cornac
 France Dougnac as Elisabeth

Release
The premiere of Les Pétroleuses was on 17 December 1971 at the Balzac cinema in Paris.

Reception

Critical response
The film received generally negative reviews. Bardot's performance in particular was criticised by Jean Loup Passek, who noted how uncomfortable she seemed in the film's outdoors action setting. Writing in Variety Gene Moskowitz dismissed the film as "predictable, naive and gauche" whilst Tom Milne called it "drearily unfunny".

See also
List of Spaghetti Western films
1971 in film

References

External links
 

1971 films
1970s Western (genre) comedy films
1970s historical comedy films
Films directed by Christian-Jaque
French historical comedy films
1970s French-language films
French Western (genre) comedy films
British Western (genre) comedy films
Italian Western (genre) comedy films
Spanish Western (genre) comedy films
Films set in the 1880s
Films scored by Francis Lai
Corsica in fiction
Italian historical comedy films
Spanish historical comedy films
British historical comedy films
Girls with guns films
1970s British films
1970s French films
1970s Italian films